Natascha McElhone (born Natascha Abigail Taylor, 14 December 1971) is a British actress. She is a graduate of the London Academy of Music and Dramatic Art. In film, she is best known for her roles in Ronin (1998), The Truman Show (1998), and Solaris (2002). On television, she has portrayed Karen van der Beek, the long-time partner of Hank Moody, in the Showtime comedy-drama series Californication (2007–2014), First Lady Alex Kirkman in the ABC political drama Designated Survivor (2016–2017), and Laz Ingram in Beau Willimon's Hulu science-fiction series The First (2018). McElhone also portrayed Penelope Knatchbull in season 5 of The Crown.

Early life
She was born Natascha Abigail Taylor in Walton-on-Thames, Surrey on 14 December 1971[1][3] to Noreen McElhone and Michael Taylor, both journalists.[4] She took her mother's maiden name as her stage name.[3] McElhone has a scriptwriter brother, Damon, who lives in Los Angeles; and two half-brothers: Alexander, who lives in Zürich, and Nicholas, who lives in Stockholm. Her parents separated when she was two. Her Irish mother moved the family to Brighton and later married journalist and columnist Roy Greenslade.

McElhone, who took lessons in Irish dancing from ages six to 12, was educated at St. Mark's CofE Primary School, Brighton, St Mary's Hall, Brighton, Fortismere School, London, Camden School for Girls, London and William Ellis, London. She graduated from the London Academy of Music and Dramatic Art in 1993.[5]

Career
McElhone began her career in the theatre, including starring roles in Richard III and A Midsummer Night's Dream at the Open Air Theatre, Regent's Park, London, and in The Count of Monte Cristo and The Cherry Orchard at the Haymarket Theatre, Leicester. She made her television debut in the BBC's Bergerac in 1991 (credited on screen as Natascha Taylor) and was seen in an episode of Absolutely Fabulous in 1992. 

McElhone was seen in two episodes of the Dennis Potter TV miniseries Karaoke. Her first major box-office role came with Surviving Picasso (1996), with co-star Anthony Hopkins. One of her most successful films to date has been The Truman Show (1998) with Jim Carrey. She had leading roles opposite Brad Pitt in The Devil's Own (1997), Robert De Niro in Ronin (1998), and George Clooney in Solaris (2002).

Co-starring with Bill Pullman, McElhone appeared in the NBC miniseries Revelations (2005). She starred in a 2006 West End production of Honour at the Wyndham's Theatre alongside Diana Rigg and Martin Jarvis. She then accepted a leading role in the Showtime cable television series Californication as Karen, alongside David Duchovny. In 2009 McElhone became a spokeswoman for Neutrogena. In 2010, she was the voice of Marie in the video game Castlevania: Lords of Shadow from Konami.

McElhone featured as Juliet's mother, Lady Capulet, in Romeo and Juliet (2013), a film adaptation of Shakespeare's play. Douglas Booth and Hailee Steinfeld were the leads, and Damian Lewis played her husband. In 2014, she played the role of Alex Forrest in Fatal Attraction, at the Theatre Royal Haymarket. In 2015, McElhone starred as Sarah Churchill in the Royal Shakespeare Company's production of Helen Edmundson's Queen Anne.

In February 2016, she was cast alongside Kiefer Sutherland in ABC's political drama Designated Survivor, which premiered in September 2016. She left the show in Season 2 to take a role in the Hulu series The First. In 2022, McElhone portrayed Penelope Knatchbull in season 5 of The Crown.

Personal life
McElhone married plastic surgeon Martin Hirigoyen Kelly on 19 May 1998. The couple lived in Fulham, south-west London, with their sons Theodore (born 2000) and Otis (born May 2003); their third son, Rex, was born in October 2008, five months after Kelly's death.

On 20 May 2008, 43-year-old Kelly was found slumped in the doorway of his family's home by a fellow doctor, who had him rushed to Chelsea and Westminster Hospital (where he worked). He could not be revived and died one day after his 10th wedding anniversary. A postmortem exam revealed the cause of death to have been dilated cardiomyopathy.

After her husband's sudden death, McElhone continued to write letters to him, sometimes documenting the daily trivia of life but also dealing with how she and their young children were coping with their loss. These letters and diary entries formed the basis of her book After You: Letters of Love, and Loss, to a Husband and Father. The book was published in July 2010 (titled After You in the UK Kindle version).

Filmography

Awards

References

External links

 

1969 births
Living people
20th-century British actresses
21st-century British actresses
20th-century English actresses
21st-century English actresses
Actresses from Surrey
Alumni of the London Academy of Music and Dramatic Art
British film actresses
British memoirists
British people of Irish descent
British Shakespearean actresses
British stage actresses
British television actresses
British voice actresses
English memoirists
English film actresses
English people of Irish descent
English stage actresses
English television actresses
English video game actresses
English voice actresses
People from Walton-on-Thames